Outer Banks is an American action-adventure mystery teen drama streaming television series created by Josh Pate, Jonas Pate, and Shannon Burke that premiered on Netflix on April 15, 2020. The series is set in a community in the Outer Banks of North Carolina and follows conflict between two groups of teenagers in search of a lost treasure.

In December 2021, the series was renewed for a third season which premiered on February 23, 2023. In February 2023, ahead of the third season premiere, the series was renewed for a fourth season.

Premise
Outer Banks is set in a coastal town along the Outer Banks of North Carolina, where there is a stark social divide between wealthy seasonal residents and working-class locals (who have the nicknames  "Kooks" and "Pogues," respectively). The show follows a group of Pogue teenagers who live at The Cut, and are determined to find out what happened to the missing father of the group's ringleader, John B. Along the way, they discover a legendary treasure that is tied to John B's father.

Chased by the law and a wealthy group of Kooks from Figure Eight, the Pogues seek to overcome obstacles such as love, fighting, friendship and money.

Cast and characters

Main

 Chase Stokes as John B. Routledge, the ringleader of the Pogues, love interest of Sarah Cameron, and later her boyfriend
 Madelyn Cline as Sarah Cameron,  daughter of Ward Cameron, John B's love interest, and later his girlfriend. She is referred to by many as the princess of the Kooks, however, her rebellious side often rejects the Kook life and gets her mixed up with the Pogues.
 Madison Bailey as Kiara "Kie" Carrera, the daughter of a successful restaurant owner who hangs out with the Pogues. She is technically a Kook as she comes from a wealthy family and lives in Figure Eight, but they reject her due to her affiliation with the Pogues.
 Jonathan Daviss as Pope Heyward, the brains of the Pogues
 Rudy Pankow as JJ Maybank, John B's reckless, loyal best friend since the third grade who suffers abuse from his father
 Austin North as Topper, Sarah's ex-boyfriend and fellow Kook who despises the Pogues
 Charles Esten as Ward Cameron (seasons 1–3), Sarah, Wheezie and Rafe's father, a wealthy business owner who lives on the wealthier part of the Outer Banks known as "Figure Eight"
 Drew Starkey as Rafe Cameron, Wheezie and Sarah's older brother who's a drug addict and has anger issues
 Carlacia Grant as Cleo (season 3; recurring season 2), a crew member of Captain Terrance's cargo ship from Nassau who befriends Sarah and John B, and after becomes a member of the group

Recurring 

 Adina Porter as Sheriff Peterkin (season 1), the local sheriff of Kildare County
 Cullen Moss as Deputy Shoupe, a sketchy cop who tries to redeem himself by taking down Ward
 Julia Antonelli as Wheezie Cameron, Sarah and Rafe's younger sister who often helps Sarah out
 Caroline Arapoglou as Rose, the Cameron siblings' stepmother and Ward's wife
 E. Roger Mitchell as Heyward, Pope's father and local businessman 
 CC Castillo as Lana Grubbs (season 1), the widow of a man named Scooter Grubbs who was killed during Hurricane Agatha
 Chelle Ramos as Deputy Plumb (seasons 1–2), a cop who works alongside Sheriff Peterkin and Deputy Shoupe
 Brian Stapf as Cruz (season 1)
 Deion Smith as Kelce, Rafe's friend and fellow Kook 
 Marland Burke as Mike Carrera, Kie's father who used to be a pogue but became a Kook due to his marriage with Kie's mom
 Nicholas Cirillo as Barry, Rafe's drug dealer and the owner of a pawn shop
 Charles Halford as Big John (seasons 1–3), John B's presumed dead father-
 Gary Weeks as Luke (seasons 1–2), JJ's abusive drug addict and alcoholic father
 Mary Rachel Quinn as Dr. Thornton
 Samantha Soule as Anna Carrera, Kie's mother who worries about Kie's involvement with the Pogues 
 Adam Donahue as Agent Bratcher (seasons 1–2) who is investigating the murders
 Terence Rosemore as Captain Terrance (seasons 1–2), the captain of the cargo ship heading to Nassau, Bahamas who transports John B and Sarah when their boat is overturned 
 Elizabeth Mitchell as Carla Limbrey (season 2–present), Ward's former associate in finding the Royal Merchant
 Jesse C. Boyd as Renfield (season 2), Limbrey's younger half-brother who helps her
 Andy McQueen as Carlos Singh (season 3), a ruthless Caribbean man who is obsessed with finding the El Dorado treasure
 Lou Ferrigno Jr. as Ryan (season 3), Carlos' right-hand man
 Fiona Palomo as Sofia (season 3)

Episodes

Season 1 (2020)

Season 2 (2021)
{{Episode table |background=#252C3D |overall=5 |season=5 |title=27 |director=13 |writer=32 |airdate=18 |released=y |episodes=

{{Episode list
 |EpisodeNumber   = 18
 |EpisodeNumber2  = 8
 |Title           = The Cross
 |DirectedBy      = Darnell Martin
 |WrittenBy       = Josh Pate & Shannon Burke
 |OriginalAirDate = 
 |ShortSummary    = Pope and JJ deduce from Denmark's diary and his last words that the treasure is buried near a tree named Angel Oak, near the Freedman's Church Denmark built for the slaves he freed. At Angel Oak, the Pogues realize the true treasure is Cecilia's body; they lay a wreath on her casket and bury her again after Rafe, Renfield and Limbrey defiled her grave looking for the cross. An inscription on the Merchant'''s spyglass, hidden in the tree, reveals the cross is at the church. JJ and Kie get her dad's truck so the Pogues can get to the church; Luke leaves Kildare for good and JJ says goodbye to his dad. At the church, Pope gets an idea when he sees wooden crosses above them through the spyglass. He uses a crowbar to reveal the cross under two hollow beams. Rafe and Renfield have followed the Pogues there. Wasps start stinging Pope and he falls on the cushions the Pogues have stacked under him. The Cross falls too.   
 |LineColor       = 252C3D
}}

}}

Season 3 (2023)

Production
Development
On May 3, 2019, it was announced that Netflix had given the production a series order for a first season consisting of ten episodes. The series was created and executive produced by Josh Pate, Jonas Pate, and Shannon Burke. On July 24, 2020, Netflix renewed the series for a second season. On December 7, 2021, Netflix renewed the series for a third season. On February 18, 2023, ahead of the third season premiere, Netflix renewed the series for a fourth season.

Casting
Alongside the initial series announcement, it was reported that Chase Stokes, Madelyn Cline, Madison Bailey, Jonathan Daviss, Rudy Pankow, Charles Esten, Austin North, and Drew Starkey were cast in starring roles. On July 2, 2019, Caroline Arapoglou joined the cast in a recurring role. On October 22, 2020, Elizabeth Mitchell was cast in a recurring role for the second season. On April 15, 2021, Carlacia Grant joined the cast in a recurring capacity for the second season. Upon the third season renewal, Grant was promoted to a series regular. On June 23, 2022, Andy McQueen, Fiona Palomo, and Lou Ferrigno Jr. were cast in undisclosed capacities for the third season. On July 5, 2022, Stokes' stand-in double, Alexander "AJ" Jennings, was killed in a hit-and-run accident near Charleston, South Carolina.

Filming
Co-creator Jonas Pate envisioned filming in Wilmington, North Carolina, but Netflix opted not to film the show there because of the state's House Bill 2 legislation. Principal photography for the first season began on May 1, 2019, in Charleston, South Carolina. Filming for the second season began on August 31, 2020, and concluded on April 2, 2021. Filming for the third season began on February 15, 2022.

Release
The first season of Outer Banks premiered on April 15, 2020. The second season was released on July 30, 2021. The third season premiered on February 23, 2023.

Reception
Critical response

Steve Greene of IndieWire gave the series' first season a B- and wrote a review saying, "Some of those later confrontations buckle under the weight of their plot connecting, but when Outer Banks dials its melodrama to its own sweet spot, there's enough fun to keep a story-hungry audience following along the trail." Reviewing the series for The Hollywood Reporter, Daniel Fienberg described the series' first season as "pretty people, pretty cinematography, pretty dumb" and said, "the show is positively littered with characters and plot threads that feel like they might have been relevant or even important in a 13-episode season or a YA novel that offered more breathing room."

On Rotten Tomatoes, the first season holds an approval rating of 71% based on 21 reviews, with an average rating of 6.72/10. The website's critical consensus reads, "Outer Banks over-the-top melodrama is balanced out by a strong sense of adventure that's bound to hook those looking to capture that summer feeling." On Metacritic, it has a weighted average score of 61 out of 100 based on 9 reviews, indicating "generally favorable reviews".

The second season has an 86% approval rating on Rotten Tomatoes, based on 7 reviews, with an average rating of 6.7/10.

On Rotten Tomatoes, the third season holds an approval rating of 50% based on 8 reviews, with an average rating of 4.1/10.

Audience viewership
For the week of August 2 to 8, 2021, Outer Banks was ranked number one in the Nielsen ratings U.S. streaming chart, who announced that the show had been viewed for a total of 2.1 billion minutes of its 20 episodes. For the following week, the series was ranked number one again in the Nielsen ratings U.S. streaming chart with a total of 1.16 billion total minutes of viewing for the 20 episodes.

Legal matter
On December 21, 2020, a North Carolina teacher and author named Kevin Wooten filed a lawsuit against Netflix and the creators of Outer Banks, claiming they stole the plot of his novel Pennywise: The Hunt For Blackbeard's Treasure!''. Wooten had sought for ongoing royalties and damages payments. The lawsuit was ultimately dismissed by federal judge Timothy Batten the following year in favor of the Pate brothers and Burke. In a 25-page opinion, Batten noted that the plots of Wooten's novel and the series shared similarities with respect to the themes of shipwrecks and finding buried treasure but opined that the substantial differences in other aspects, such as the plot and characterization, meant that analyzing the plots of both works "at such a high level of abstraction would render every work involving a hunt for treasure susceptible to copyright infringement."

Awards and nominations

Other media
On February 18, 2023, Netflix held a fan event called 'Poguelandia' in Huntington Beach, California. Musical performances included: Khalid, Lil Baby, alt-J, Elley Duhé, Surf Mesa, and The Nude Party. The Outer Banks starring cast: Chase Stokes, Madelyn Cline, Madison Bailey, Jonathan Daviss, Carlacia Grant, Rudy Pankow, Austin North, and Drew Starkey were in attendance.

References

External links
 
 
 

2020 American television series debuts
2020s American mystery television series
2020s American teen drama television series
American action adventure television series
American adventure drama television series
American thriller television series
Coming-of-age television shows
English-language Netflix original programming
Mass media portrayals of the upper class
Mass media portrayals of the working class
Television series about teenagers
Television shows filmed in Barbados
Television shows filmed in South Carolina
Television shows set in North Carolina
Working-class culture in the United States